The 7th Lithuanian Tatar Regiment was a military unit of the Grand Duchy of Lithuania. It was also known as the Tartar Regiment of Alexander Ulano.

History

Formation 
The Regiment was formed in May 1792.

Service 
The regiment was pressed into the service of the Targowica Confederation in October 1792. The regiment was stationed in Ivanava (1792 Dec).

Commanders 
The unit was commanded of the legendary Colonel Aleksander Mustafa Ułan.

Uniforms 
All officers and men had red czapkas, which themselves had a black lambswool band in addition to a white plume. They all had one left-hand white epaulette. The red saddle cloth had white edging.

References

Sources 

 
 

Military units and formations established in 1792
Cavalry regiments of Lithuania